Clivina vagans is a species of ground beetle in the subfamily Scaritinae. It was described by Putzeys in 1866.

References

vagans
Beetles described in 1866
Beetles of New Zealand